Punggol Coast MRT station is a future underground Mass Rapid Transit (MRT) station on the North East line (NEL) in northern Punggol, Singapore. The station, set to be completed in 2024, will serve the upcoming Punggol Digital District (PDD), an integrated mixed-use commercial development, alongside the new campus of the Singapore Institute of Technology (SIT). Once completed, it will replace Punggol station as the line's northern terminus.

First announced in 2013, plans for the station's construction were brought forward from 2030 to 2023 in conjunction with development plans for the area. Due to the COVID-19 pandemic, the expected operational date of the station was pushed back to 2024.

History

The station was first announced by Transport Minister Lui Tuck Yew on 17 January 2013, as part of the NEL extension (NELe). The NEL was planned to be extended one station north to serve future developments in Punggol North, and the extension expected to be completed in 2030 in tandem with development plans. 

However, in June 2017, the Land Transport Authority and Second Minister for Transport Ng Chee Meng announced that the  extension would be accelerated to 2023 in conjunction with development plans for the area. When completed, the station was expected to serve 75,000 passengers in the area.

Construction 
Contract 715 for the design and construction of this station was awarded to China State Construction Engineering Corporation Limited (Singapore Branch) in December 2017. Construction started in 2017, with an initial expected completion date of 2023.

The tunnel boring machines (TBMs) for the NELe works were launched near Punggol station, with a receiving shaft at the other end. The TBMs have sensors that allows precise and safe tunneling operations. 

Tunneling works for the NELe were completed on 13 November 2020, with 40% of the construction works completed. With restrictions imposed on construction due to the COVID-19 pandemic, Transport Minister Ong Ye Kung announced at the tunnel breakthrough that the station's completion date would be pushed back to 2024.

Station details
Punggol Coast station will be the terminus of the NEL with an official station code of NE18. The adjacent station will be Punggol station. The station will be located in Punggol North and serve the Punggol Digital District alongside the new Singapore Institute of Technology (SIT) campus.

Intended to improve commuters' experience at the station, the station will have an open public spaces within the interior, alongside a dedicated area for the community to showcase their exhibits and projects.

References

External links

Punggol
Mass Rapid Transit (Singapore) stations
Railway stations scheduled to open in 2024
Proposed railway stations in Singapore